Jason Watson (born 2 March 1991) is a Jamaican footballer who most recently played for Wilmington Hammerheads, as a midfielder.

Career
Watson played with Waterhouse F.C. between 2011 and 2014, including two loan spells with USL PDL club Jersey Express in 2012 and Finnish club KPV Kokkola in 2013. Watson signed with USL Pro club Wilmington Hammerheads on 26 March 2014.

References

External links

1991 births
Living people
Jamaican footballers
Waterhouse F.C. players
Jersey Express S.C. players
Wilmington Hammerheads FC players
Jamaican expatriate footballers
Expatriate footballers in Finland
Expatriate soccer players in the United States
Jamaican expatriate sportspeople in the United States
USL Championship players
USL League Two players
Association football midfielders